Maria Uladzimirauna Paliakova (born 28 August 1992) is a Belarusian pair skater. With partner Nikita Bochkov, she has won several senior international medals and the Belarus national title.

Paliakova skated with Mikhail Fomichev from January 2010 to spring 2012. She then teamed up with Bochkov.

Programs

With Bochkov

With Fomichev

Competitive highlights

With Bochkov

With Fomichev

References

External links 

 
 

Belarusian female pair skaters
1992 births
Living people
Figure skaters from Minsk